Pao is a genus of mostly freshwater pufferfish with one species  (P. leiurus) also occurring in brackish water. They are found in Southeast Asia. Until 2013, its species were generally placed in Tetraodon.

Species
There are currently 15 recognized species in this genus:

 Pao abei (T. R. Roberts, 1998)
 Pao baileyi (Sontirat, 1989) (Hairy puffer)
 Pao barbatus (Roberts, 1998) 
 Pao bergii (Popta, 1905)
 Pao brevirostris (Benl, 1957)
 Pao cambodgiensis (Chabanaud, 1923)
 Pao cochinchinensis (Steindachner, 1866)
 Pao fangi (Pellegrin & Chevey, 1940)
 Pao hilgendorfii (Popta, 1905)
 Pao leiurus (Bleeker, 1850)
 Pao ocellaris (Klausewitz, 1957)
 Pao palembangensis (Bleeker, 1852)
 Pao palustris (Saenjundaeng, Vidthayanon & Grudpun, 2013)
 Pao suvattii (Sontirat, 1989)
 Pao turgidus (Kottelat, 2000)

References

Tetraodontidae
Freshwater fish of Asia
Freshwater fish genera
Taxa named by Maurice Kottelat